Taylor is a small unincorporated community in Union Township, Tippecanoe County, in the U.S. state of Indiana.

History

Beginning in the middle of the 19th century, the town, sometimes referred to as Taylor Station, was a stop along a railroad line that ran south out of Lafayette (variously the New Albany and Salem Railroad, the Louisville, New Albany and Corydon Railroad, etc.).  The local post office was known as Farmers Institute, which ran from 1866 to 1899.

Geography 
It sits near the eastern edge of Union Township and is on a CSX Transportation rail line.

References 

Unincorporated communities in Tippecanoe County, Indiana
Unincorporated communities in Indiana
Lafayette metropolitan area, Indiana